Yitzhak Lamdan (Hebrew: יצחק למדן; ‎ 7 November 1899 – 17 November 1954) was an Israeli Hebrew-language poet, translator, editor and columnist.

Biography
Itzi-Yehuda Lubes or Lobes (later Yitzhak Lamdan) was born in 1899 in  Mlynov, Russia (now called Mlyniv, Ukraine).

Born into an affluent family,  Lamdan lived in Mlynov until the outbreak of WWI in 1917 and the civil wars that followed. During this period, he was uprooted and wandered through Southern Russia with his brother before joining the Red Army. In 1920, after his parents’ home was destroyed and his brother was killed, Lamdan immigrated to Mandatory Palestine as part of a socialist youth group in what has come to be known in Zionist history as the Third Aliyah.

In 1927, he published a Hebrew epic poem called "Masada: A Historical Epic" about the Jewish struggle for survival in a world full of enemies, in which Masada, as a symbol for the Land of Israel and the Zionist enterprise, was seen as a refuge, but also as a potential ultimate trap; the poem was hugely influential, but the latter aspect was left out in its mainstream Zionist reception and interpretation. According to literary scholar and cultural historian David G. Roskies, Lamdan's poem even inspired the uprising in the Warsaw Ghetto.

Awards and recognition
 In 1955, Lamdan was awarded the Israel Prize, for literature.
 Brenner Prize

From 1954 until 1983, the Ramat Gan Municipality, in conjunction with the Hebrew Writers Association in Israel, awarded the annual Lamdan Prize in his memory, for literary works for children and youth.

References

See also 
List of Israel Prize recipients

Hebrew-language poets
Israeli poets
Israel Prize in literature recipients
Brenner Prize recipients
1899 births
1954 deaths
Ukrainian emigrants to Israel
Ukrainian Jews
Jews in Mandatory Palestine
Israeli Jews
Israeli columnists
Israeli translators
20th-century translators
20th-century poets
Epic poets